Narelda Jacobs is an Australian television journalist with Network 10 and NITV in Sydney. Prior to her January 2020 appointment as a panellist and reporter on the morning talk show Studio 10, she had been a news presenter for 10 News First in Perth, Western Australia since 2008. She is the first Aboriginal, and first openly lesbian, newsreader in Western Australia.

Early life and education
Jacobs, of Whadjuk Noongar heritage, was raised in Perth. Her father, Cedric, was a Uniting Church reverend and her mother, Margaret, was also involved in the ministry. She has said that she was raised in a fundamentalist Christian household, and attended born-again churches until her late teens.

Jacobs was the youngest of five daughters. Her mother was born in Belfast and of Irish and English descent, while her father was a Whadjuk Noongar man and a member of the Stolen Generation. He was active in Aboriginal politics, and journalists would often be at their house or talking with him on the phone. Jacobs and her parents were always interested in what was making the news. Jacobs says she decided in Year 7 that she wanted to pursue a career in journalism. She attended Hampton Senior High School.

After finishing high school, Jacobs applied to the Western Australian Academy of Performing Arts (WAAPA) but was not accepted. She got her first job working at the front desk of the National Native Title Tribunal (NNTT) and soon moved to their media department. Shortly afterwards, at 18, Jacobs became pregnant to her boyfriend of two years. She got married due to family pressure and her religious upbringing but six months after the birth of her daughter, the marriage ended.

With the support of her family, Jacobs returned to work at the NNTT. After working for the NNTT for five years, Jacobs reapplied for WAAPA at the encouragement of her boss. She was successful and began a degree in broadcast journalism at WAAPA.

Career
After graduation, Jacobs began her career at GWN in Bunbury. She joined Ten News in Perth in 2000, eventually becoming their court reporter, and also filling in as weather presenter over summer. In 2008, Network Ten announced that production of their Perth news bulletin would return to Perth from Sydney, and selected Jacobs as the new presenter.

Jacobs is the first Aboriginal, and first openly lesbian newsreader in Western Australia. She publicly supported a "Yes" vote in the 2017 Australian Marriage Law Postal Survey.

In March 2019, Jacobs co-hosted SBS's broadcast of the Sydney Gay and Lesbian Mardi Gras. She co-hosted again in 2020 and 2021.

On 13 January 2020 Jacobs relocated to Sydney, after 20 years at 10 News First Perth, to join the Studio 10 morning talk show as a panellist. However, later in 2020, Jacobs returned to read the Perth edition of 10 News First while juggling with working on Studio 10 following the network-wide cost cutting that saw the bulletin move back to Sydney.

In 2020 and 2021, Jacobs co-hosted the Sunrise Ceremony on 26 January with John Paul Janke. The event was simulcast on NITV, SBS and Channel 10.

Other roles
In November 2021 Jacobs was appointed to the inaugural National Indigenous Advisory Group of Football Australia. The group aims at supporting and increasing Aboriginal and Torres Strait Islander participation in soccer.

Personal life 
Jacobs came out as a lesbian to her mother at 21. Her mother was not accepting of her sexuality; Jacobs never told her father.

Jacobs lives in Sydney with her partner, filmmaker Stevie Cruz-Martin. Her daughter, Jade Dolman, is an artist who works under the name JD Penangke.

References

Living people
10 News First presenters
Australian television journalists
People from Perth, Western Australia
Australian LGBT journalists
Lesbians
Australian people of Indigenous Australian descent
Australian LGBT broadcasters
1975 births